Francis Bull (4 October 1887–4 July 1974) was a Norwegian literary historian, professor at the University of Oslo for more than thirty years, essayist and speaker, and magazine editor.

Early and personal life
Bull was born in Kristiania, son of medical doctor Edvard Isak Hambro Bull (1845–1925) and Ida Marie Sofie Paludan (1861–1957). He was brother to theatre director Johan Peter Bull, historian and politician Edvard Bull and genealogist Theodor Bull. Through Edvard Bull he was the uncle of historian Edvard Bull. He was also nephew to military officer Karl Sigwald Johannes Bull, grandnephew to Anders Sandøe Ørsted Bull, great-grandson to Georg Jacob Bull and great-great-grandson to Chief Justice Johan Randulf Bull.

In June 1924 he married Ingrid Berntsen (1896–1976).

Career
Bull finished his secondary education and enrolled at the University of Oslo, mainly being tutored by Gerhard Gran. The last work earned him the cand.philol. degree. His doctoral dissertation of 1916 was titled .

Bull was appointed professor in Nordic literature at the University of Oslo in 1920, succeeding the aging Gerhard Gran. In addition to lecturing he co-edited the literary history  (four volumes, 1924–1937).

Bull was editor-in-chief of the journal Edda from 1925 to 1960. He was chairman of the board of Gyldendal Norsk Forlag from 1925 to 1968, and a board member of the National Theatre from 1922 to 1956, with the exception of the years 1941 to 1945. Norway was invaded and occupied by Nazi Germany in 1940, and because the National Theatre board did not abide by the directions from the Nazi government, Bull, along with board members publisher Harald Grieg and banker Johannes Sejersted Bødtker, was arrested in 1941. Bull spent three years in a concentration camp, Grini. As he had an excellent memory, he was able to continue his lecturing in prison, by holding secret lectures for co-prisoners. Due to this, Grini was nicknamed "the People's University" by some. Bull won recognition for this, and was a popular public speaker and lecturer after the war.

Bull was chairman of the Norwegian Academy of Science and Letters several times between 1941 and 1957, again except for 1941–1945. He held an honorary degree at Aarhus University from 1946, and was decorated as a Commander with Star of the Royal Norwegian Order of St. Olav in 1957. He retired as a professor in 1957, and died in July 1974 in Hørsholm, Denmark.

References

External links 
Family genealogy

1887 births
1974 deaths
Writers from Oslo
Norwegian essayists
Norwegian literary critics
Norwegian magazine editors
Norwegian literary historians
University of Oslo alumni
Academic staff of the University of Oslo
Members of the Norwegian Academy of Science and Letters
Grini concentration camp survivors
Members of the Norwegian Academy
20th-century  Norwegian historians
20th-century essayists